Quinlan Vos is a fictional character in the Star Wars franchise. Vos was voiced by Al Rodrigo in the Star Wars: The Clone Wars television series. The character also appears in various canon and non-canon Star Wars media like books and comics.

Born on the planet of Kiffu and raised at the Jedi Temple on the planet of Coruscant, Vos is a Jedi Master and a member of the Galactic Republic, who wields a green-bladed lightsaber. He was also a Jedi General during the Clone Wars and was one of the Jedi to survive Order 66.

Appearances
The character of Quinlan Vos made his first public appearance in The Phantom Menace (1999).

Skywalker saga

Revenge of the Sith
Quinlan Vos is mentioned by Obi-Wan Kenobi during Revenge of the Sith with him referencing that Vos has moved his troops to the planet of Boz Pity.

Television

The Clone Wars
Quinlan Vos appeared in season 3, episode 9 and was on a mission with Obi-Wan Kenobi to find Ziro the Hutt who was broken out of prison by Cad Bane.

Obi-Wan Kenobi
During episode 3 of the Obi-Wan Kenobi television series, Obi-Wan Kenobi discovers Quinlan Vos's name carved on the wall and realizes that Quinlan was there at The Path in the safehouse on the planet of Mapuzo, where he was helping people, Jedi, and force sensitive children get to safety.

Books

Dark Disciple 

After Mahranee was attacked by Separatists, Dark Disciple begins. The Jedi Council meets to discuss the devastation the Clone Wars are wreaking on the galaxy. They come to the conclusion that Count Dooku must die, and they devise a plan to assassinate him. The Council selects Asajj Ventress, a former Sith student, and Jedi Quinlan Vos as a team. Even though Ventress has good cause to distrust the Jedi, they think that if given the right encouragement, her animosity for Dooku may lead her to act against her former master.

Promotion
Quinlan Vos has been featured in Hasbro and Lego Star Wars toys.

References

External links
 
 

Characters created by George Lucas
Fictional generals
Fictional genocide survivors
Fictional war veterans
Male characters in comics
Male characters in film
Male characters in television
Star Wars comics characters
Star Wars Jedi characters
Star Wars literary characters
Star Wars Skywalker Saga characters
Star Wars: The Clone Wars characters